Pracejovice is a municipality and village in Strakonice District in the South Bohemian Region of the Czech Republic. It has about 300 inhabitants.

Administrative parts
The village of Makarov is an administrative part of Pracejovice.

Notable people
Rudolf Beran (1887–1954), politician, prime minister of Czechoslovakia

References

Villages in Strakonice District